Édouard-Charles St-Père (24 September 1876 – 31 January 1950) was a Liberal party member of the House of Commons of Canada. He was born in Sainte-Mélanie, Quebec at Joliette County and became a journalist who was with the newspaper Le Canada for two decades.

He was first elected to Parliament at the Hochelaga riding in the 1921 general election then re-elected in 1925, 1926, 1930 and 1935. In 1940, St-Père was appointed to the Senate for the De Lanaudière, Quebec division and remained a Senator until his death on 31 January 1950 at his Westmount, Quebec residence after ailing for a considerable time with an undisclosed condition.

References

External links
 

Canadian senators from Quebec
Liberal Party of Canada MPs
Liberal Party of Canada senators
Members of the House of Commons of Canada from Quebec
French Quebecers
People from Lanaudière
1876 births
1950 deaths